Pungitius laevis, commonly known as smoothtail ninespine stickleback, is a species of freshwater fish of the family Gasterosteidae. It is distributed in temperate brackish benthopelagic waters of coastal western Europe.

Taxonomy
Pungitius laevis was first formally described as Gasterosteus laevis in 1829 by the French zoologist Georges Cuvier with its type locality given as the basin of the Seine at Bobigny. This taxon has been considered to be conspecific with the ninespine stickleback (P. pungitius), sometimes treated as a western European subspecies of that holarctic species. The specific name, laevis, means "smooth" and allusion to the lack of scutes on the caudal peduncle.

Description 
Pungitius laevis have a concave snout head shape, truncate caudal fin, and elongated body shape. It has a total of nine dorsal spines and 10-11 pectoral fin rays. Adults typically have a coloration of bright green with darker green tints which are covered by black blotches.

Distribution and habitat
Pungitius laevis is found in western Europe in Ireland, southern Great Britain and from the Netherlands to the Garonne in France where it is found in densely vegetated shallow, still waters. It is a benthopelagic species which is found in fresh, brackish and marine waters.

Biology 
Adult specimen prefer still, densely vegetated shallow water where they have access to zooplankton, benthic insects, and small crustaceans.

Reproduction 
Breeding season lasts from April to June, with males being responsible for nesting and guarding the eggs before they hatch. Nests are usually built by vegetation, and eggs usually take around 10 to 20 days to hatch. Males die at the end of breeding season.

References 

Laevis
Freshwater fish of the Arctic
Freshwater fish of Europe
Fish described in 1829
Taxa named by Georges Cuvier
Holarctic fauna